John Steele House, also known as Lombardy, is a historic plantation house located at Salisbury, Rowan County, North Carolina.  It was built between 1799 and 1801, and is a two-story, three bay, side hall plan, Federal style frame dwelling.  It has a side gable roof, one-story shed roof porch, and is sheathed with beaded weatherboards.  The house was restored between 1977 and 1983.  It was the home of North Carolina politician John Steele (1764-1815).

It was listed on the National Register of Historic Places in 1994.

References

Plantation houses in North Carolina
Houses on the National Register of Historic Places in North Carolina
Federal architecture in North Carolina
Houses completed in 1801
Houses in Salisbury, North Carolina
National Register of Historic Places in Rowan County, North Carolina